The 2013 Australian Swimming Championships were held from 26 April until 3 May 2013 at the South Australia Aquatic and Leisure Centre in Adelaide, South Australia. They doubled up as the national trials for the 2013 World Aquatics Championships.

Qualification criteria

Below were the entry qualifying times for each event that had to be achieved after 1 January 2012 in a 50m pool.

Below were the FINA A and B qualifying times for the 2013 World Aquatics Championships for each event.

Medal winners

Men's events

Legend:

Women's events

Legend:

References

Australian championships
Australian Swimming Championships
Sports competitions in Adelaide
Swimming Championships
2010s in Adelaide
April 2013 sports events in Australia